Kalletal is a municipality in the Lippe district of North Rhine-Westphalia, Germany, with c. 13,500 inhabitants (2019).

Comprising villages (Ortschaften)

 Asendorf
 Bavenhausen
 Bentorf
 Brosen
 Erder
 Heidelbeck
 Henstorf
 Hohenhausen
 Kalldorf
 Langenholzhausen
 Lüdenhausen
 Osterhagen
 Stemmen
 Talle
 Tevenhausen
 Varenholz
 Westorf

References

External links
 Official website 

Towns in North Rhine-Westphalia
Lippe
Principality of Lippe